Love!: Thelma Love Song Collection is a compilation of love songs by Thelma Aoyama. It was released on February 11, 2009 in Japan and became her first #1 album on the Japanese Oricon Weekly Chart. The last track "Again" is a cover of the Janet Jackson song of the same name. The album was preceded by the four singles ", ", " and ". The DVD section includes music videos for these singles. The album is certified Gold for shipment of 100,000 copies.

Track listing

Charts 
Oricon Sales Chart (Japan)

External links 
Thelma Aoyama LOVE! ~THELMA LOVESONG COLLECTION~ 

Japanese-language albums
2009 greatest hits albums
Thelma Aoyama albums